O Filme ao vivo em Natal is the first live album by the Brazilian band Cavaleiros do Forró, released in 2005. The album was recorded during a single concert performed on November 28, 2004, at Estádio Machadão in Natal, Rio Grande do Norte.

Cavaleiros do Forró was the first forró band to record a DVD in a football stadium.

Track listing 
Abertura
Alô
Se réi pra la
Vá dar trabalho a outro
O Esporte da Mulher (O Karatê)
Bebo, rico e brabo
Avise a ela
Mar de Doçura
A vontade que eu tenho
A música do dia
Pra sempre
Acústico:
Minha história
Os Outros
Você vai ver
Abertura II
Frete
Ciúme
Mulher eletricista
Doce desejo
Iô Iô
Penitência
Só você
Homenagem Vaqueiros:
Sonho de vaquejada
Com a corda toda

Certifications

References

Cavaleiros do Forró albums
2004 live albums
Portuguese-language albums